Q-School 2016 – Event 2 was the second of two qualifying tournaments for the 2016/17 snooker season. It took place from 17 to 22 May 2016 at Meadowside Centre in Burton-upon-Trent, England.

The four qualifying spots were won by Michael Georgiou, John Astley, David John and Alex Borg who beat Craig Steadman, Peter Lines, Zak Surety and Alexander Ursenbacher respectively in the finals of their draw, whereas Craig Steadman, Jamie Curtis-Barrett, Ian Preece and Adam Duffy claimed the last four qualifying spots through the Q School Order of Merit.

Format
The tournament consisted of players being randomly assigned to four sections. Each section plays in the knockout system with the winner of each section earning a two-year tour card to play on the main tour for the 2016/17 snooker season and 2017/18 snooker season. All matches will be the best-of-7.

Main draw

Round 1

Best of 7 frames

Section 1

Section 2

Section 3

Section 4

Century Breaks

 133  Andy Hicks
 122  Ryan Causton
 120  Greg Casey
 114, 110  Tony Drago
 112  Ashley Hugill
 111  Peter Lines
 106  Jordan Brown
 104  Peter Delaney
 104  Lukas Kleckers
 104  Zak Surety
 102  Jamie Brown
 101  Chen Zifan
 101  Richard William King
 100, 100  Craig Steadman

References

Snooker competitions in England
Q School (snooker)
2016 in snooker
2016 in English sport
Sport in Burton upon Trent
May 2016 sports events in the United Kingdom